Federal College of Education, Zaria is a College of science and art based in Zaria, Nigeria. It was established by the then Northern Region Government of Nigeria in November 1962. It was initially named Northern Secondary Teachers College and later known as Advanced Teachers’ College Zaria, under the administrative and policy control of Ahmadu Bello University, Zaria, until 1991. The institution was initially located at the present site of Nuhu Bamalli Polytechnic (Annex) before it was moved to Gyallesu, opposite Ahmadu Bello University, Kongo Campus - Zaria in 1973. it was later disarticulated from ABU, Zaria and renamed Federal College of Education, Zaria. in May 2015, it was converted to a University of Education, together with some other Colleges in the Country, by the PDP government. later in August same year, the APC government reversed the conversion to its former status as Federal College of Education, Zaria, including all the others.

The current Provost of the college is Dr. Suleiman Balarabe, who was appointed following the expiration of Dr. Abdullahi Ango Ladan's tenure in February, 2021.

College Library 
The College library is headed by college librarian. the library is well equipped with relevant information resources like journal, books and study materials including internet connectivity for effectives services to staff and students in the college.

Schools and courses offered 
The courses offered by the institution are;

School of Arts & Social Sciences 
 Christian Religious Studies (NCE & ABU Degree)
 Geography (NCE & ABU Degree)
 Islamic Religious Studies (NCE & ABU Degree)
 Social Studies (NCE & ABU Degree)
 Economics (NCE & UDUS Degree)
 Cultural and Creative Art
 Theatre Art
 Political Science

School of Education 
 General Studies in Education
 Pre-NCE & Remedial Studies
 Curriculum and Instruction
 Foundation of Education
 Educational Psychology
 Educational Administration and Planning (ABU Degree)
 Library and Information Science (ABU Degree)
 Guidance and Counselling (UDUS Degree)

School of Languages 
 Arabic (NCE & ABU Degree)
 English (NCE & ABU Degree)
 French
 Yoruba
 Hausa (NCE & ABU Degree)
 Igbo

School of Sciences 
 Biology (NCE & ABU Degree)
 Computer Science (NCE & UDUS Degree)
 Chemistry (NCE & ABU Degree)
 Integrated Science (NCE & ABU Degree)
 Mathematics (NCE & ABU Degree)
 Physical & Health Education(PHE) (NCE & ABU Degree)
 Physics

School of Vocational and Technical Education 
 Agric Education (NCE & ABU Degree)
 Business Education (NCE & ABU Degree)
 Home Economics (NCE & ABU Degree)

School of Early Child Care and Primary Education 
 Early Childhold Care Education
 Primary Education (NCE & UDUS Degree)

School of Special Education 
 Adult and Non-Formal Education (NCE & UDUS Degree)
 Special and Non-Formal Education

Affiliations 
The College of Education is affiliated to the Ahmadu Bello University Zaria  (ABU) and Usman Dan Fodio University Sokoto. (UDUS)

See also 
List of colleges of education in Nigeria

References

External links 
https://wenr.wes.org/2017/03/education-in-nigeri

Universities and colleges in Kaduna State
Federal colleges of education in Nigeria
Educational institutions established in 1962
1962 establishments in Nigeria
Zaria